Gerdeh Pey-e Ajam (also Romanized as Gerdeh Pey-e Ājam; also known as Gerd Pey) is a village in Ajam Rural District, Dishmok District, Kohgiluyeh County, Kohgiluyeh and Boyer-Ahmad Province, Iran. At the 2006 census, its population was 26, in 4 families.

References 

Populated places in Kohgiluyeh County